Filomena is a form of the Greek female given name Philomena.  It means "friend of strength" (φίλος : phílos "friend, lover" and μένος : ménos "mind, purpose, strength, courage") or "loved one" (φιλουμένη :  philouménē meaning "loved").  Filomena is the name of one of the storytellers in the frame story of The Decameron.

People with the name Filomena

Filomena Barros Dos Reis, East Timorese activist
Filomena Campus, Italian singer
Filomena Cautela, Portuguese presenter
Filomena Costa, Portuguese runner
Filomena Dato, Spanish writer
Filomena Delli Castelli, Italian politician
Filomena Embaló, Bissau-Guinean writer
Filomena Linčiūtė-Vaitiekūnienė, Lithuanian artist
Filomena Margaiz, Mexican politician
Filomena Moretti, Italian guitarist
Filomena Rotiroti, Canadian politician
Filomena Tassi, Canadian politician
Filomena Mascarenhas Tipote, Bissau-Guinean politician
Filomena Trindade, Angolan handball player
Filomena Valenzuela Goyenechea, Chilean soldier

See also
Philomena (given name)
Filomena (disambiguation)

References

Feminine given names